Buffalo Springs is an unincorporated community in Bowman County, North Dakota, United States.

Climate
According to the Köppen Climate Classification system, Buffalo Springs has a semi-arid climate, abbreviated "BSk" on climate maps.

References

Unincorporated communities in Bowman County, North Dakota
Unincorporated communities in North Dakota